The 2009–10 Ukrainian Premier League youth championship season is a competition between the U-21 youth teams of Ukrainian Premier League clubs. The events in the senior leagues during the 2008–09 season saw FC Lviv Reserves and FC Kharkiv Reserves all relegated and replaced by the promoted teams Zakarpattia Reserves and Obolon Kyiv Reserves.

Final standings

Top scorers
Last updated 8 May 2010

See also
2009–10 Ukrainian Premier League

References

Reserves
Ukrainian Premier Reserve League seasons